Tri-Mountain State Park is an isolated public recreation area located in the towns of Wallingford and Durham, Connecticut. The state park encompasses portions of Fowler Mountain and Trimountain. With no road access, the park can only be reached via the Mattabesett Trail. The park originated in 1925 after Wallingford resident John B. Kendrick  donated a six-acre parcel on the summit of Trimountain's southern peak that he had purchased for protective purposes in 1906.

References

External links
Tri-Mountain State Park Connecticut Department of Energy and Environmental Protection

State parks of Connecticut
Parks in New Haven County, Connecticut
Parks in Middlesex County, Connecticut
Protected areas established in 1925
Durham, Connecticut
Wallingford, Connecticut
1925 establishments in Connecticut